Nazas is a city and seat of the municipality of Nazas, in the state of Durango, north-western Mexico.  As of 2010, the town of Nazas had a population of 3,622. The greatest extent of the solar eclipse of April 8, 2024 will be near Nazas.

References

Populated places in Durango